Nikolina Brnjac (born 11 July 1978) is a Croatian politician serving as Minister of Tourism and Sports since 2020. She is affiliated with the Croatian Democratic Union party.

See also 
Cabinet of Andrej Plenković II

References 

Living people
1978 births
People from Karlovac
Croatian Democratic Union politicians
21st-century Croatian women politicians
21st-century Croatian politicians
Women government ministers of Croatia
University of Zagreb alumni